John Carson Febiger (14 February 1821 – 9 October 1898) was a rear admiral of the United States Navy who served with  the Union Navy during the American Civil War.

Biography
Febiger's father was the adopted son of American Revolutionary War soldier Christian Febiger. He became passed midshipman on 20 May 1844, and lieutenant on 30 April 1853.

On 11 August 1862, he was commissioned commander, and assigned to the steamer  of the Western Gulf Blockading Squadron.

He commanded the gunboat , of the Asiatic Squadron 1866–1868, and on 6 May 1868 was promoted to captain. He was inspector of naval reserve lands 1869–1872, was made commodore on 9 August 1874, was a member of the Board of Examiners 1874–1876, and commandant of the Washington Navy Yard 1876–1880. He was promoted to rear admiral on 4 February 1882, and on 1 July 1882 was retired on his own application, having been in the service over forty years.

Febiger is buried in Arlington National Cemetery.

Notes

References
 

1821 births
1898 deaths
United States Navy rear admirals (upper half)
Union Navy officers
People of Pennsylvania in the American Civil War
Burials at Arlington National Cemetery